Roy Justin Thomas (born June 22, 1953) is an American former professional baseball pitcher in Major League Baseball (MLB) who played for the Houston Astros, St. Louis Cardinals and Seattle Mariners in all or parts of eight seasons spanning 1977–1987. Listed at 6' 5" and 215 pounds, Thomas batted and threw right-handed. He was born in Quantico, Virginia.

Career

Philadelphia Phillies
At Lompoc High School, he was teammates with Roy Howell. He was selected sixth overall in the 1971 MLB draft by the Philadelphia Phillies out of Lompoc High at eighteen years old.

Chicago White Sox
After two more seasons in the Phillies' farm system, the once deemed "untouchable" Thomas was dealt to the Chicago White Sox along with Dick Ruthven and Alan Bannister in exchange for Jim Kaat and Mike Buskey on December 10, . In his only season in the Sox organization, Thomas went 6-11 with a 3.75 ERA with their Triple-A affiliate, the Iowa Oaks. Afterwards, he was selected by the Seattle Mariners with the 31st pick in the 1976 MLB expansion draft. The Mariners then placed him on waivers toward the end of spring training, then worked out a trade to the Houston Astros for infielder Larry Milbourne.

Houston Astros
In his two games against the Braves, Thomas blew a save opportunity while surrendering four hits and two earned runs in 2.1 innings pitched. In his two games against the Dodgers, he pitched four innings and gave up just one hit while striking out two.

St. Louis Cardinals
On June 23, he was selected off waivers by the St. Louis Cardinals, and brought directly to the majors.

In his first appearance with the Cardinals, Thomas earned a win by pitching two scoreless innings in an extra innings affair with the Pittsburgh Pirates. He earned saves in his next two appearances against the Montreal Expos, but was roughed up by the Chicago Cubs in his next two outings. After one more relief appearance, he made an emergency start against the San Diego Padres, and gave up five runs in four innings for his first career loss. He returned to the bullpen after that, and earned one save with a 1.54 ERA the rest of the way.

Thomas began the  season assigned to the triple A Springfield Redbirds, where he was converted back to a starter. He was called up July 1, and immediate made his first start in the second game of a doubleheader with the Phillies. He gave up one earned run in seven innings, but did not figure in the decision. He earned his first win as a starter on August 7 against the New York Mets. Overall, Thomas went 3-4 with a 2.92 ERA and one save mostly in middle relief.

He earned a spot in the Cardinals' bullpen in Spring , but got off to a horrible start to the regular season (11.57 ERA & 1 blown save in April). He then entered the starting rotation, and made the finest start of his major league career on May 14 against the Padres. In seven innings, he surrendered five hits and one earned run to earn the win. On May 30, after returning to the bullpen, he struck Montreal Expos outfielder Ellis Valentine in the face with a pitch, shattering his cheekbone. He remained in the Cards' bullpen another month until he was optioned down to Springfield to make room for Silvio Martinez's return from the disabled list. After the season, he was drafted by the Oakland Athletics in the 1980 rule 5 draft.

Seattle Mariners
In , Thomas went 12-8 with a 3.05 ERA and 111 strikeouts for Oakland's triple A affiliate, the Tacoma Tigers, but did not see any major league experience. After the season, he was dealt to the Seattle Mariners for minor leaguers Tim Hallgren and Rusty McNealy.

He spent his first Spring with his new club in the majors, but was shipped to the triple A Salt Lake City Gulls just as the  season was set to begin. His 88.2 innings pitched was tops for a right hander on the club.

A sore elbow in his pitching arm derailed his  season. Though he was only with the M's for a little over half the season, he appeared in 21 games and pitched 49.2 innings. He actually retired briefly, but reconsidered, and began the season in the Pacific Coast League with the Calgary Cannons.

He was brought up to Seattle in late May, and immediately became manager Chuck Cottier's favorite arm out of the bullpen. The Mariners set a franchise record with an eight-game winning streak in late June. Thomas appeared in three games during that stretch, and earned two wins while holding opposing batters to a .190 batting average. When fortunes reversed, and the M's were on a six-game losing streak in late July, Thomas pitched 6.1 brilliant innings of relief against the American League champion Boston Red Sox to break the streak. Despite having missed almost two months of the season, he pitched a team high 93.2 innings in relief, compiling a 7-0 record with a 3.36 ERA and seventy strikeouts. As a result, Thomas earned the distinction of having compiled the most wins without a loss ever on a team with a losing record when he went 7-0 for the 1985 Seattle Mariners (74-88).  This record would be matched by Aaron Sele in the 2001 Mariners season.

His sore elbow returned just as the  season was set to start. As it turned out, he had elbow tendinitis which rendered him unable to pitch the entire season at any level.

He was released by the M's in December, but returned the following Spring as a non-roster invitee. He earned a spot with the triple A Calgary Cannons, and was brought to the majors in late June. On July 9,  Thomas pitched 4.2 scoreless innings against the Red Sox to earn his first win of the season. Coupled with his 7-0 record in 1985, Thomas ended his major league career with an eight-game winning streak.

Having spent most of his career in the American League, Thomas only logged 34 career at-bats with 4 hits. His only career run batted in came off Randy Jones on July 19, 1978.

Defensively, Thomas was a perfect fielder in the majors. In 419.1 innings pitched in 182 appearances, he recorded a 1.000 fielding percentage, handling 90 total chances with 36 putouts and 54 assists.

Senior Professional Baseball Association
Thomas also pitched for the St. Lucie Legends and the Sun City Rays of the Senior Professional Baseball Association from 1989–1990, until the league folded in the 1990 midseason.

After baseball
Following his playing retirement, Thomas worked as a math teacher at Totem Middle School and Illahee Middle School in the Federal Way, Washington School District.

He formerly worked at Milwaukie High School/ Milwaukie Academy of the Arts as a campus monitor but retired early in October of 2017.

Thomas currently lives in Las Vegas, Nevada along with his wife, Jane.

References

External links

1953 births
Living people
American expatriate baseball players in Canada
Baseball players from Virginia
Buffalo Bisons (minor league) players
Calgary Cannons players
Charleston Charlies players
Denver Zephyrs players
Houston Astros players
Iowa Oaks players
Major League Baseball pitchers
People from Federal Way, Washington
People from Quantico, Virginia
Reading Phillies players
Rocky Mount Phillies players
Salinas Spurs players
Salt Lake City Gulls players
Seattle Mariners players
Spartanburg Phillies players
Springfield Redbirds players
St. Louis Cardinals players
St. Lucie Legends players
Sun City Rays players
Tacoma Tigers players
Toledo Mud Hens players
Walla Walla Phillies players